Benjamin O'Neale Stratford, 4th Earl of Aldborough (1746 – 11 July 1833) styled The Honourable from 1763 until 1823, was an Irish peer and politician of the noble House of Stratford.

He was the fourth son of John Stratford, 1st Earl of Aldborough and his wife Martha O'Neale, daughter of Venerable Benjamin O'Neale, Archdeacon of Leighlin, and a younger brother of Edward Stratford, 2nd Earl of Aldborough. In 1823, he succeeded his older brother John as earl.

In 1777, Aldborough entered the Irish House of Commons for Baltinglass, the same constituency his father and his older brother has represented before, and sat as Member of Parliament until 1783. In 1790, he stood again for Baltinglass and was returned for it until the Act of Union in 1801. He was Governor of County Wicklow in 1777.

On 10 January 1774, he married Martha Burton, daughter of John Burton. They had a son and three daughters. Aldborough died at Stratford Lodge and was buried at Baltinglass. He was succeeded in his titles by his only son Mason.

References

Benjamin
1833 deaths
Irish MPs 1776–1783
Irish MPs 1790–1797
Irish MPs 1798–1800
Members of the Parliament of Ireland (pre-1801) for County Wicklow constituencies
1746 births
Earls of Aldborough